Walajapet is a town or municipality and a part of Ranipet district in the state of Tamil Nadu. The streets in the town form a square shape which is a unique feature of the town. It will be easy for you to reach any part of the town with this kind of infrastructure. The streets are wide and nicely structured. As of 2011, the town had a population of 32,397.

This town, located in the Ranipet district, and is considered to be the first municipality and taluk of Tamil Nadu, believed to have been formed in 1866.

Demographics

According to 2011 census, Walajapet had a population of 32,397 with a sex-ratio of 1,031 females for every 1,000 males, much above the national average of 929. A total of 3,249 were under the age of six, constituting 1,675 males and 1,574 females. Scheduled Castes and Scheduled Tribes accounted for 12.19% and .16% of the population respectively. The average literacy of the town was 77.25%, compared to the national average of 72.99%. The town had a total of 7,598 households. There were a total of 12,223 workers, comprising 50 cultivators, 66 main agricultural labourers, 1,270 in house hold industries, 10,204 other workers, 633 marginal workers, 8 marginal cultivators, 18 marginal agricultural labourers, 182 marginal workers in household industries and 425 other marginal workers. As per the religious census of 2011, Walajapet had 52.13% Hindus, 46.34% Muslims, 1.21% Christians, 0.03% Sikhs, 0.02% Buddhists, 0.11% Jains, 0.14% following other religions and 0.02% following no religion or did not indicate any religious preference.

Commerce
It was used for business purpose and one of the biggest trade centres during the time of British rule.
Walajapet is one of the oldest town in the North Arcot Region. It is famous for silk weaving and has a nickname, "Walajapet-The Silk City". It is situated in the belt of the Ranipet SIPCOT Industrial Complex as a public limited company wholly owned by the Government.

Walajapet is one of the noted centre for the production of silk weaving and bamboo furniture making centre. The commercial activities is concentrated at Thoppai street, Annaicut Road, Bazaar street, Thirumalai Street.  There is a daily market available in this town.

History
At the beginning of the second half of 18th century, while English and the French invaders, who challenged themselves each other to conquer Southern India and while in such circumstances the former ( the English) in collaboration with the Nawab of Arcot succeeded in wiping out the suzerainty of the latter. The Nawab of Arcot was in return, granted the then great title of honour "Walajah" meaning the most dignified gentleman.

The Nawab of Arcot styled this town as "Walajah" in his memory besides, having Arcot as his residential centre and Ranipet as the military headquarters. The Nawab of Arcot with a view to vindicate the great name of "Walajah" as quite suitable to the town in its true and literal sense, desired to develop this town economically. Walajapet's jurisdiction covers an area of 2.64 squares kilometers. The town had a population of 16,401 in 1971 and the same was increased to 21,200 in 1987–88.

Municipal administration
Walajapet Municipality was started in 1866, by the effect of act passed by government. It was the first municipality in Tamil Nadu. It was one of the oldest municipalities organized in the Madras Presidency along with Adoni and Madurai. The Municipal council started function from 12 November 1866. The municipal office is located in its own building at Nawab Devadi street. The town has electoral wards.

In the year 1869, the municipality office was shifted to a house situated at the trunk road for a monthly rent of Rs.6/-.At the time, it was a third grade municipality.

The municipal council stated functioning from 1866, after the formation of Walajapet Municipality the meeting was held on 12 November 1866 under the vice-president, 6 commissioners also attended the council meeting. In those days the councillors was called commissioners. The council passed a resolution to open a municipal office for the transaction of business and in accordance with it a building owned by Madhan Iyyar was taken for a monthly rent Rs.5/-. There were one manager on a pay of Rs.40 per month, two writers each Rs.20 per month, two bill collectors each for Rs.20 per month, two peons each for Rs.5 per month and one sweeper for Rs.3 and eight annas per month.

Thiru V.Lakshmi Naidu was the first vice-president of this municipality. Thiru C.A. Varadharajan was the 25th vice-president of this municipality. Mrs. S.Raja Rajeswari was the first woman chairman and 26th chairman of this municipality.

The year 1966 was a very significant in the development of Walajapet Municipality. It was its centenary celebrations. At that time C.A.Varadharajan was chairman in the municipality. He published Walajapet Municipality Centenary Souvenir (1866–1966) Aringar Anna, Thanthi Periyar who participated the Centenary celebration. And Jakir Hussain, C.P. Aditanar, M. Karunanithi, Dr. S.Radhakrishnan, K. Kamaraj, Tamil thatha M. Varatharajan and many other send greeting to the function.

Transport
Walajah Road Railway Station is one of the oldest and first railway station in South India. It is situated in Ammoor and about 5 Kilometers from Walajapet. The first contract between the Madras Railway company and the government was held on 22 December 1852 an agent for the Madras railway came to Madras in 1853. The first section of the line from Royapuram(Madras) to Walajah road was opened on 1 July 1856.

One of the oldest railway stations in Southern Railway. First railway track was proposed at 1857 from Walaja Road to Cuddalore via Katpadi.

It is strategically located on the Palar River on the Chennai-Bangalore line. By bus, this locality can be reached in about 30 minutes from Vellore city and in about 2 hours from Chennai. It is well connected both by road and railways.  Walajah Road railway station is located about 4.5 km from the town, lying between Arakkonam and Vellore Katpadi Junction on the important railway route connecting Chennai to Coimbatore and Bangalore. It was the station connecting Arakkonam Junction and Vellore Katpadi Junction, the first rail route in Tamil Nadu.

References

External links
Historical Monuments in Walajapet

Cities and towns in Ranipet district